Actinomyces gerencseriae is a species in the genus Actinomyces once known as Actinomyces israelii serovar II.

A. gerencseriae was named for bacteriologist Mary Ann Gerencser.

References

External links
 Type strain of Actinomyces gerencseriae at BacDive -  the Bacterial Diversity Metadatabase

Actinomycetales
Gram-positive bacteria
Bacteria described in 1990